Kanchana Kamalanathan is an Indian politician. She was born in Krishnagiri. She is the leader of women wing in Dravida Munnetra Kazhagam party in Tamil Nadu. She was elected to Tamil Nadu legislative assembly in 1989 and 1996 from Krishnagiri constituency. She is the wife of M. Kamalanathan who was also a politician and member of parliament from Krishnagiri constituency. She is also a graduated doctor.

References 

Dravida Munnetra Kazhagam politicians
Living people
20th-century Indian women politicians
20th-century Indian politicians
Tamil Nadu MLAs 1989–1991
Tamil Nadu MLAs 1996–2001
Year of birth missing (living people)
Women members of the Tamil Nadu Legislative Assembly